Billy and the Big Stick is a 1917 American silent comedy drama film directed by Edward H. Griffith and starring Raymond McKee, Yona Landowska and William Wadsworth.

Cast
 Raymond McKee as Billy Barlow
 Yona Landowska as Claire Ducrot
 William Wadsworth as President Hamilcar Poussevain
 Jessie Stevens as Widow Ducrot
 Bradley Barker as Harry St. Clair
 Joseph Burke as Monsieur Paillard

References

Bibliography
 Robert B. Connelly. The Silents: Silent Feature Films, 1910-36, Volume 40, Issue 2. December Press, 1998.

External links
 

1917 films
1917 drama films
1910s English-language films
American silent feature films
American black-and-white films
Films directed by Edward H. Griffith
Edison Studios films
1910s American films
Silent American drama films